ObGES is a microdistrict in Sovetsky City District of Novosibirsk, Russia. It is located on the western banks of the Ob River and Novosibirsk Reservoir.

History
The microdistrict originated in the 1950s as a work settlement of the builders of Novosibirsk Hydroelectric Station.

In 1950, the construction of the hydroelectric power began.

In 1958, the district became part of the Sovetsky City District.

In 1959, Nikita Khrushchev visited the hydroelectric power.

July 29, 1959, Richard Nixon visited the hydroelectric power.

Streets

Organizations
 Novosibirsk Capacitor Plant
 Taira Plant
 Pilot Plant
 ORMZ
 Ob Hydrometeorological Observatory
 RusHydro

Monuments and memorials
 Statue of the Soldier-Liberator
 Conquerors of Ob is a mosaic panel created in 1970 by Vladimir Sokol.

Recreation
Вeaches of Novosibirsk Reservoir are located in the microdistrict.

By the Ob Sea Park is a park located in Chemskoy Pine Forest. It was created in 1957 by the builders of the hydroelectric power.

References

Sovetsky District, Novosibirsk
Neighborhoods in Russia